Eduardo Arolas (February 24, 1892 – September 29, 1924) was an Argentine tango  bandoneon player, leader and composer.

Arolas first learned to play the guitar before learning the bandoneon which became his instrument of choice. His nickname was El Tigre del bandoneón (the tiger of the bandoneon).

Arolas composed his first tango in 1909 before he could even read or write music. He went on to play with such early masters as Agustín Bardi and Roberto Firpo.

In 1917 Arolas moved to Montevideo where he settled, he played a number of times at the Teatro Casino. From 1920 he resided mainly in Paris where he died alone and alcoholic in 1924.

Legacy
Arolas is regarded as one of the early masters that helped to define the future of tango music in Argentina. He was avant-garde in his composition and often utilised unconventional instruments such as the saxophone violoncello and the banjo.

His most famous works include Lágrimas, La cachila, El Marne and Viborita.

External links
 Eduardo Arolas on todotango.com
 Eduardo Arolas on tango.info

References

1892 births
1924 deaths
Musicians from Buenos Aires
Argentine emigrants to Uruguay
Argentine tango musicians
Place of birth missing
Musicians from Montevideo
Burials at La Chacarita Cemetery